Remote Data Services (RDS, formerly known as Advanced Data Connector or ADC) is an older technology that is part of Microsoft SQL Server, and used in conjunction with ActiveX Data Objects (ADO).  RDS allowed the retrieval of a set of data from a database server, which the client then altered in some way and then sent back to the server for further processing. With the popular adoption of Transact-SQL, which extends the SQL programming with constructs such as loops and conditional statements, RDS became less necessary and it was eventually deprecated in Microsoft Data Access Components version 2.7. Microsoft produced SOAP Toolkit 2.0, which allows clients to do this via an open XML-based standard.

External links
 Remote Data Service (RDS) Programmer's Guide

Microsoft application programming interfaces